The Sebring 76 Twelve Hours of Endurance, was the second round of the 1976 IMSA GT Championship. The race was held at the Sebring International Raceway, on March 20, 1976. Victory overall went to the No. 14 G. W. Dickinson/Holbert Porsche-Audi Porsche 911 Carrera RSR driven by Al Holbert and Michael Keyser.

Race results 
Class winners in bold.

Class Winners

References 

IMSA GTP
12 Hours of Sebring
12 Hours of Sebring
Sebring
12 Hours of Sebring